The Ingalls 4-S was an experimental American locomotive built by Ingalls Shipbuilding immediately after World War II. Intended as the first of many Ingalls-built locomotives, it was the only one the company built. It served on the Gulf, Mobile and Ohio Railroad (GM&O) until it was retired in 1966; it was scrapped the following year.

Design and development
At the end of World War II, Ingalls Shipbuilding, based in Pascagoula, Mississippi, developed plans for a line of diesel-electric locomotives to serve the expected post-war market. Five models were projected; the first, and as it proved only, to be built was a prototype of the largest, the model 4-S.

A single demonstrator was planned in December 1945, and built in March 1946, numbered #1500. The design of the locomotive was considered advanced, including a "turret cab" arrangement, which improved the crew's vision. The prime mover selected for the locomotive was the inline-8 65LX8, based on a marine diesel engine built by Superior Engines & Compressors; and modified for railroad use by Cooper-Bessemer, and Elliott Company providing the turbocharger. Provision was made for the installation of a steam generator for passenger service. The locomotive was equipped with connections for multiple unit operation.

Operational service
The 4-S demonstrator was tested by a number of railroads, including the Louisville and Nashville, Seaboard Air Line, Mississippi Export Railroad, Gulf, Mobile and Ohio, and the Southern Railway; however no orders materialized for the type, or for any other of Ingalls' proposed locomotives. The lack of orders combined with issues with the supply of components resulted in Ingalls electing to abandon its plans for locomotive construction; the sole 4-S was the only locomotive they ever built. It was sold to the Gulf, Mobile and Ohio Railroad for US$140,000 in June 1946, where it received the road number 1900.

The 4-S served with the GM&O, operating primarily from Mobile, Alabama, to Jackson, Mississippi, but also served around Meridian and Laurel. It was used in switching duty, earning a reputation for toughness; it once derailed, landing inverted, but was repaired and returned to service in short order. In 1966, the railroad traded it in to EMD as partial payment for new SD40s. It was offered to the Illinois Railway Museum for US$3,000, but the museum was unable to raise the funds. When no other buyers materialized, it was sold to Pielet Brothers in 1967, where it was scrapped.

References
5. ^ Rutherford , R. C. (2013). Ingalls Shipbuilding (1949). The Diesel Shop. Retrieved November 9, 2022, from https://www.thedieselshop.us/Ingalls_Flyer.pdf

B-B locomotives
Ingalls Shipbuilding locomotives
Diesel-electric locomotives of the United States
Gulf, Mobile and Ohio Railroad
Railway locomotives introduced in 1946
Experimental locomotives
Standard gauge locomotives of the United States
Individual locomotives of the United States
Scrapped locomotives
Unique locomotives